FTL may stand for:

Science and technology 
 Faster-than-light communication and travel
 Ferritin light chain, encoded by the FTL gene
 Flash Translation Layer
 Foot-lambert ft-L, a measure of luminance
 Olympus FTL, a camera
 FreeMarker template language

Games 
 Faster Than Light (software publisher), a British video game publisher
 FTL: Faster Than Light, a video game
 FTL Games, an American video game developer

Other uses 
 Fort Lauderdale, Florida, United States
 Fort Lauderdale station, Amtrak code FTL
 Freedom to Learn, in Michigan, United States
 Fruit of the Loom, an American clothing manufacturer
 Full truck load